Novyye Cherkassy (Yañı Çerkassı) is a rural locality (a settlement) in Ufa, Bashkortostan, Russia. The population was 1,944 as of 2010. There are 5 streets.

Geography 
Novyye Cherkassy is located 26 km northeast of Ufa. Ivanovsky is the nearest rural locality.

References 

Rural localities in Ufa urban okrug